Claude Fonnereau (22 March 1677, La Rochelle – 5 April 1740, Hoddesdon) was a French Huguenot refugee who settled in England and became a prominent merchant. He was the founding father of the Fonnereau family in England.

In 1735 he purchased Christchurch Mansion in Ipswich, Suffolk, from Price Devereux, 10th Viscount Hereford.

He was a Director of the Bank of England from 1738 to 1740.

Family life
Claude was the son of Zacharie Fonnereau and Marguerite Chataigner. He married Elizabeth Bureau, also a Huguenot, the daughter of Anne Bureau, and had several children:
 Thomas Fonnereau (1699–1779), a merchant and politician, who inherited his father's estates, including Christchurch Mansion
 Dr. Claude (or Claudius) Fonnereau (1701–1785), who inherited Christchurch Mansion on his elder brother's death
 Elizabeth Frances Fonnereau (born 1702), who married James (Jacques) Benezet, also from a Huguenot family, who had settled in London
 Abel Fonnereau (1703–1753)
 Anne Fonnereau (born 1704), who married Philip Champion de Crespigny (1704–1765), also from a Huguenot family, who had settled in Camberwell, and was the father of Sir Claude Champion de Crespigny, 1st Baronet, and Philip Champion de Crespigny
 Zachary Philip Fonnereau (1706–1778), a merchant and politician who was the father of Philip Fonnereau and Martyn Fonnereau and grandfather of Thomas George Fonnereau
 Peter Fonnereau (1709–1743)
 Marie Anne (born 1711), who married John Martyn
 Elizabeth (born 1712), who married Mr. De Hauteville

References

1677 births
1740 deaths
Huguenots
Businesspeople from Ipswich
French emigrants to the Kingdom of Great Britain
18th-century English businesspeople
People from La Rochelle
People associated with the Bank of England